Jacek Gutowski (born 25 July 1960 in Warsaw –  in Warsaw) was a Polish male weightlifter, who competed in the flyweight class and represented Poland at international competitions. He won the silver medal at the 1986 World Weightlifting Championships in the 52 kg category. He participated at the 1988 Summer Olympics in the 52 kg event.

References

1960 births
1996 deaths
Polish male weightlifters
World Weightlifting Championships medalists
Sportspeople from Warsaw
Olympic weightlifters of Poland
Weightlifters at the 1988 Summer Olympics
20th-century Polish people